Tumlin-Zacisze  is a village in the administrative district of Gmina Zagnańsk, within Kielce County, Świętokrzyskie Voivodeship, in south-central Poland.

References

Tumlin-Zacisze